The 1944 Purdue Boilermakers football team was an American football team that represented Purdue University during the 1944 Big Ten Conference football season.  In their first season under head coach Cecil Isbell, the Boilermakers compiled a 5–5 record, finished in third place in the Big Ten Conference with a 4–2 record against conference opponents, and outscored opponents by a total of 207 to 166.

Notable players from the 1944 Purdue team included fullback Babe Dimancheff, end Frank Bauman, and tackle Pat O'Brien.

Schedule

Games summaries

Marquette
 Bump Elliott 7 rushes, 121 yards

Indiana
 Babe Dimancheff 16 rushes, 140 yards

References

Purdue
Purdue Boilermakers football seasons
Purdue Boilermakers football